Legoland Discovery Centre is an indoor family attraction chain operated by British leisure group Merlin Entertainments. Featuring models and attractions inspired by the Lego building toys, the Discovery Centres are smaller versions of the Legoland theme parks located around the world.

Attractions

Discovery Centres include models of local landmarks rendered in Lego bricks. Visitors can also learn how the Lego bricks are manufactured or partake in building classes taught by a Master Model Builder. Certain locations may also include 4-D movie theatres offering multiple showings throughout the day. 

A number of children's attractions, such as small rides and play fortresses, are also available. The centres can host birthday parties as well as scholastic and group functions and also include restaurants and gift shops selling Lego merchandise.

Master Model Builder
Master Model Builders are the Brand Face of LEGOLAND Discovery Centre. They responsible for all events and LEGO Models. They are chosen with competition called Brick Factor.

Reception
The target audience for the Legoland Discovery Centre is families with young children, normally ages 3 through 12; though a typical location's average guest is about seven years of age. Discovery Centres are located near other family-friendly attractions and dining establishments. In a given year, a single facility can host approximately 400,000 to 600,000 visitors.

Locations
, Legoland Discovery Centres are operating in 27 different locations:

Future locations 

 Germany
 Hamburg, scheduled to open in Autumn of 2023.

 India
 In January 2017, Merlin Entertainments Indian subsidiary stated that it was in discussion with real estate firms to open locations in multiple cities in India.

 United States
 American Dream Miami, Miami, scheduled to open in 2023.
 The Mall at Robinson, Pittsburgh, scheduled to open in mid 2023.
 Springfield Town Center, Springfield, Virginia, scheduled to open in 2023.

Notes

References

External links

 Official home page

Legoland